Joseph Williams Thorne (December 25, 1816 - 1897) was a politician in North Carolina. He was from the North. He was a Quaker. He served in the North Carolina House of Representatives and the North Carolina Senate. He was also a delegate at one of the state's constitutional conventions. He wrote poetry.
He was born in Pennsylvania. He was tried according to a statute against legislators denying the existence of almighty God. He was expelled from the North Carolina House of Representatives.

In a letter he stated he was for temperance and against all use of alcohol and never played cards.

References

Members of the North Carolina House of Representatives
People from Pennsylvania
1816 births
1897 deaths